State Route 72 (SR 72) is a north–south state highway in the U.S. state of Ohio. Its southern terminus is at US 62 near Highland, and its northern terminus is at SR 334 just north of Springfield. As it travels through Springfield, Ohio, it is known as Limestone Street.

History
Prior to receiving the designation of SR 72, the route of what is now SR 72 was included within the state highway system in 1915 along various routes. The Penn Township–Springfield routes were unified as SR 72 in 1923 routed mostly along the same roads it runs today. The only major change that occurred to the highway's routing happened around 1972 when US 68 was routed out of Springfield on a freeway west of the city. SR 72 was extended north along the former US 68 to end north of the city. The interchange that currently serves as SR 334's western terminus was SR 72's northern terminus at first but was truncated to its current terminus by 2003.

Major junctions

References

072
072
072
072
072